In mathematics, Fresnel's wave surface, found by Augustin-Jean Fresnel in 1822, is a quartic surface describing the propagation of light in an optically biaxial crystal. Wave surfaces are special cases of tetrahedroids which are in turn special cases of  Kummer surfaces.

In projective coordinates (w:x:y:z) the wave surface is given by

References

 Fresnel, A. (1822), "Second supplément au mémoire sur la double réfraction" (signed 31 March 1822, submitted 1 April 1822), in H. de Sénarmont, É. Verdet, and L. Fresnel (eds.), Oeuvres complètes d'Augustin Fresnel, Paris: Imprimerie Impériale (3 vols., 1866–70), vol.2 (1868), pp.369–442, especially pp. 369 (date présenté), 386–8 (eq.4), 442 (signature and date).

External links
Fresnel wave surface

Algebraic surfaces
Complex surfaces
Waves